Nowa Kopernia  is a village in the administrative district of Gmina Szprotawa, within Żagań County, Lubusz Voivodeship, in western Poland.

References

Nowa Kopernia